The 44th United States Congress was a meeting of the legislative branch of the United States federal government, consisting of the United States Senate and the United States House of Representatives. It met in Washington, D.C. from March 4, 1875, to March 4, 1877, during the seventh and eighth years of Ulysses S. Grant's presidency.  The apportionment of seats in the House of Representatives was based on the 1870 United States census. For the first time  since the American Civil War, the House had a Democratic majority. The Senate maintained a Republican majority.

Major events

 November 22, 1875: Vice President Henry Wilson died from a stroke
 June 25, 1876: Custer's Last Stand at the Battle of Little Bighorn
 July 4, 1876: United States Centennial
 November 7, 1876: United States general elections, 1876, including the disputed Presidential election of 1876, later settled with the Compromise of 1877 which ended Reconstruction.

Major legislation
 January 29, 1877: Electoral Commission Act, ch. 37, 
 March 3, 1877: Desert Land Act, ch. 107,

State admitted
 August 1, 1876: Colorado admitted as the 38th state

Party summary 

The count below identifies party affiliations at the beginning of the first session of this Congress, and includes members from vacancies and newly admitted states, when they were first seated. Changes resulting from subsequent replacements are shown below in the "Changes in membership" section.

During this Congress, two Senate seats and one House seat were added for the new state, Colorado.

Senate

House of Representatives

Leadership

Senate
 President: Henry Wilson (R), until November 22, 1875; vacant thereafter.
 President pro tempore: Thomas W. Ferry (R), from March 9, 1875
 Republican Conference Chairman: Henry B. Anthony
 Democratic Caucus Chairman: John W. Stevenson

House of Representatives 
Speaker: Michael C. Kerr (D), until August 19, 1876 (died)
 Samuel J. Randall (D), elected December 4, 1876
 Democratic Caucus Chairman: Lucius Quintus Cincinnatus Lamar II
 Republican Conference Chairman: George W. McCrary

Members
This list is arranged by chamber, then by state. Senators are listed by class, and representatives are listed by district.

Skip to House of Representatives, below

Senate
Senators were elected by the state legislatures every two years, with one-third beginning new six-year terms with each Congress. Preceding the names in the list below are Senate class numbers, which indicate the cycle of their election. In this Congress, Class 1 meant their term began in this Congress, facing re-election in 1880; Class 2 meant their term ended in this Congress, facing re-election in 1876; and Class 3 meant their term began in the last Congress, facing re-election in 1878.

Alabama 
 2. George Goldthwaite (D)
 3. George E. Spencer (R)

Arkansas 
 2. Powell Clayton (R)
 3. Stephen W. Dorsey (R)

California 
 1. Newton Booth (AM)
 3. Aaron A. Sargent (R)

Colorado 
 2. Henry M. Teller (R), from November 15, 1876
 3. Jerome B. Chaffee (R), from November 15, 1876

Connecticut 
 1. William W. Eaton (D)
 3. Orris S. Ferry (R), until November 21, 1875
 James E. English (D), November 27, 1875 – May 17, 1876
 William H. Barnum (D), from May 18, 1876

Delaware 
 1. Thomas F. Bayard Sr. (D)
 2. Eli M. Saulsbury (D)

Florida 
 1. Charles W. Jones (D)
 3. Simon B. Conover (R)

Georgia 
 2. Thomas M. Norwood (D)
 3. John B. Gordon (D)

Illinois 
 2. John A. Logan (R)
 3. Richard J. Oglesby (R)

Indiana 
 1. Joseph E. McDonald (D)
 3. Oliver H. P. T. Morton (R)

Iowa 
 2. George G. Wright (R)
 3. William B. Allison (R)

Kansas 
 2. James M. Harvey (R)
 3. John J. Ingalls (R)

Kentucky 
 2. John W. Stevenson (D)
 3. Thomas C. McCreery (D)

Louisiana 
 2. J. Rodman West (R)
 3. James B. Eustis (D), from January 12, 1876

Maine 
 1. Hannibal Hamlin (R)
 2. Lot M. Morrill (R), until July 7, 1876
 James G. Blaine (R), from July 10, 1876

Maryland 
 1. William Pinkney Whyte (D)
 3. George R. Dennis (D)

Massachusetts 
 1. Henry L. Dawes (R)
 2. George S. Boutwell (R)

Michigan 
 1. Isaac P. Christiancy (R)
 2. Thomas W. Ferry (R)

Minnesota 
 1. Samuel J. R. McMillan (R)
 2. William Windom (R)

Mississippi 
 1. Blanche Bruce (R)
 2. James L. Alcorn (R)

Missouri 
 1. Francis Cockrell (D)
 3. Lewis V. Bogy (D)

Nebraska 
 1. Algernon Paddock (R)
 2. Phineas Hitchcock (R)

Nevada 
 1. William Sharon (R)
 3. John P. Jones (R)

New Hampshire 
 2. Aaron H. Cragin (R)
 3. Bainbridge Wadleigh (R)

New Jersey 
 1. Theodore F. Randolph (D)
 2. Frederick T. Frelinghuysen (R)

New York 
 1. Francis Kernan (D)
 3. Roscoe Conkling (R)

North Carolina 
 2. Matt W. Ransom (D)
 3. Augustus S. Merrimon (D)

Ohio 
 1. Allen G. Thurman (D)
 3. John Sherman (R)

Oregon 
 2. James K. Kelly (D)
 3. John H. Mitchell (R)

Pennsylvania 
 1. William A. Wallace (D)
 3. Simon Cameron (R)

Rhode Island 
 1. Ambrose Burnside (R)
 2. Henry B. Anthony (R)

South Carolina 
 2. Thomas J. Robertson (R)
 3. John J. Patterson (R)

Tennessee 
 1. Andrew Johnson (D), until July 31, 1875
 David M. Key (D), August 18, 1875 – January 19, 1877
 James E. Bailey (D), from January 19, 1877
 2. Henry Cooper (D)

Texas 
 1. Samuel B. Maxey (D)
 2. Morgan C. Hamilton (R)

Vermont 
 1. George F. Edmunds (R)
 3. Justin S. Morrill (R)

Virginia 
 1. Robert E. Withers (D)
 2. John W. Johnston (D)

West Virginia 
 1. Allen T. Caperton (D), until July 26, 1876
 Samuel Price (D), August 26, 1876 – January 26, 1877
 Frank Hereford (D), from January 31, 1877
 2. Henry G. Davis (D)

Wisconsin 
 1. Angus Cameron (R)
 3. Timothy O. Howe (R)

House of Representatives
The names of members of the House of Representatives are preceded by their district numbers.

Alabama 
 . Jeremiah Haralson (R)
 . Jeremiah N. Williams (D)
 . Taul Bradford (D)
 . Charles Hays (R)
 . John H. Caldwell (D)
 . Goldsmith W. Hewitt (D)
 . William H. Forney (D)
 . Burwell B. Lewis (D)

Arkansas 
 . Lucien C. Gause (D)
 . William F. Slemons (D)
 . William W. Wilshire (D)
 . Thomas M. Gunter (D)

California 
 . William A. Piper (D)
 . Horace F. Page (R)
 . John K. Luttrell (D)
 . Peter D. Wigginton (D)

Colorado 
 . James B. Belford (R), from October 3, 1876 (newly admitted state)

Connecticut 
 . George M. Landers (D)
 . James Phelps (D)
 . Henry H. Starkweather (R), until January 28, 1876
 John T. Wait (R), from April 12, 1876
 . William H. Barnum (D), until May 18, 1876
 Levi Warner (D), from December 4, 1876

Delaware 
 . James Williams (D)

Florida 
 . William J. Purman (R)
 . Josiah T. Walls (R), until April 19, 1876
 Jesse J. Finley (D), from April 19, 1876

Georgia 
 . Julian Hartridge (D)
 . William E. Smith (D)
 . Philip Cook (D)
 . Henry R. Harris (D)
 . Milton A. Candler (D)
 . James H. Blount (D)
 . William H. Felton (ID)
 . Alexander Stephens (D)
 . Benjamin H. Hill (D), May 5, 1875 - March 3, 1877

Illinois 
 . Bernard G. Caulfield (D)
 . Carter H. Harrison (D)
 . Charles B. Farwell (R), until May 6, 1876
 John V. Le Moyne (D), from May 6, 1876
 . Stephen A. Hurlbut (R)
 . Horatio C. Burchard (R)
 . Thomas J. Henderson (R)
 . Alexander Campbell (I)
 . Greenbury L. Fort (R)
 . Richard H. Whiting (R)
 . John C. Bagby (D)
 . Scott Wike (D)
 . William M. Springer (D)
 . Adlai E. Stevenson (D)
 . Joseph G. Cannon (R)
 . John R. Eden (D)
 . William A. J. Sparks (D)
 . William R. Morrison (D)
 . William Hartzell (D)
 . William B. Anderson (I)

Indiana 
 . Benoni S. Fuller (D)
 . James D. Williams (D), until December 1, 1876
 Andrew Humphreys (D), from December 5, 1876
 . Michael C. Kerr (D), until August 19, 1876
 Nathan T. Carr (D), from December 5, 1876
 . Jeptha D. New (D)
 . William S. Holman (D)
 . Milton S. Robinson (R)
 . Franklin Landers (D)
 . Morton C. Hunter (R)
 . Thomas J. Cason (R)
 . William S. Haymond (D)
 . James L. Evans (R)
 . Andrew H. Hamilton (D)
 . John Baker (R)

Iowa 
 . George W. McCrary (R)
 . John Q. Tufts (R)
 . Lucien L. Ainsworth (D)
 . Henry O. Pratt (R)
 . James Wilson (R)
 . Ezekiel S. Sampson (R)
 . John A. Kasson (R)
 . James W. McDill (R)
 . S. Addison Oliver (R)

Kansas 
 . William A. Phillips (R)
 . John R. Goodin (D)
 . William R. Brown (R)

Kentucky 
 . Andrew Boone (D)
 . John Y. Brown (D)
 . Charles W. Milliken (D)
 . J. Proctor Knott (D)
 . Edward Y. Parsons (D), until July 8, 1876
 Henry Watterson (D), from August 12, 1876
 . Thomas L. Jones (D)
 . Joseph C. S. Blackburn (D)
 . Milton J. Durham (D)
 . John D. White (R)
 . John B. Clarke (D)

Louisiana 
 . Randall L. Gibson (D)
 . E. John Ellis (D)
 . Chester B. Darrall (R)
 . William M. Levy (D)
 . Frank Morey (R), until June 8, 1876
 William B. Spencer (D) June 8, 1876 - January 8, 1877
 . Charles E. Nash (R)

Maine 
 . John H. Burleigh (R)
 . William P. Frye (R)
 . James G. Blaine (R), until July 10, 1876
 Edwin Flye (R), from December 4, 1876
 . Harris M. Plaisted (R), from September 13, 1875
 . Eugene Hale (R)

Maryland 
 . Philip F. Thomas (D)
 . Charles B. Roberts (D)
 . William J. O'Brien (D)
 . Thomas Swann (D)
 . Eli J. Henkle (D)
 . William Walsh (D)

Massachusetts 
 . James Buffington (R), until March 7, 1875
 William W. Crapo (R), from November 2, 1875
 . Benjamin W. Harris (R)
 . Henry L. Pierce (R)
 . Rufus S. Frost (R), until July 28, 1876
 Josiah G. Abbott (D), from July 28, 1876
 . Nathaniel P. Banks (I)
 . Charles P. Thompson (D)
 . John K. Tarbox (D)
 . William W. Warren (D)
 . George F. Hoar (R)
 . Julius H. Seelye (I)
 . Chester W. Chapin (D)

Michigan 
 . Alpheus S. Williams (D)
 . Henry Waldron (R)
 . George Willard (R)
 . Allen Potter (D)
 . William B. Williams (R)
 . George H. Durand (D)
 . Omar D. Conger (R)
 . Nathan B. Bradley (R)
 . Jay A. Hubbell (R)

Minnesota 
 . Mark H. Dunnell (R)
 . Horace B. Strait (R)
 . William S. King (R)

Mississippi 
 . Lucius Q. C. Lamar (D)
 . G. Wiley Wells (IR)
 . Hernando Money (D)
 . Otho R. Singleton (D)
 . Charles E. Hooker (D)
 . John R. Lynch (R)

Missouri 
 . Edward C. Kehr (D)
 . Erastus Wells (D)
 . William H. Stone (D)
 . Robert A. Hatcher (D)
 . Richard P. Bland (D)
 . Charles H. Morgan (D)
 . John F. Philips (D)
 . Benjamin J. Franklin (D)
 . David Rea (D)
 . Rezin A. De Bolt (D)
 . John B. Clark Jr. (D)
 . John M. Glover (D)
 . Aylett H. Buckner (D)

Nebraska 
 . Lorenzo Crounse (R)

Nevada 
 . William Woodburn (R)

New Hampshire 
 . Frank Jones (D)
 . Samuel N. Bell (D)
 . Henry W. Blair (R)

New Jersey 
 . Clement H. Sinnickson (R)
 . Samuel A. Dobbins (R)
 . Miles Ross (D)
 . Robert Hamilton (D)
 . Augustus W. Cutler (D)
 . Frederick H. Teese (D)
 . Augustus A. Hardenbergh (D)

New York 
 . Henry B. Metcalfe (D)
 . John G. Schumaker (D)
 . Simeon B. Chittenden (IR)
 . Archibald M. Bliss (D)
 . Edwin R. Meade (D)
 . Samuel S. Cox (D)
 . Smith Ely Jr. (D), until December 11, 1876
 David Dudley Field (D), from January 11, 1877
 . Elijah Ward (D)
 . Fernando Wood (D)
 . Abram S. Hewitt (D)
 . Benjamin A. Willis (D)
 . N. Holmes Odell (D)
 . John O. Whitehouse (D)
 . George M. Beebe (D)
 . John H. Bagley Jr. (D)
 . Charles H. Adams (R)
 . Martin I. Townsend (R)
 . Andrew Williams (R)
 . William A. Wheeler (R)
 . Henry H. Hathorn (R)
 . Samuel F. Miller (R)
 . George A. Bagley (R)
 . Scott Lord (D)
 . William H. Baker (R)
 . Elias W. Leavenworth (R)
 . Clinton D. MacDougall (R)
 . Elbridge G. Lapham (R)
 . Thomas C. Platt (R)
 . Charles C. B. Walker (D)
 . John M. Davy (R)
 . George G. Hoskins (R)
 . Lyman K. Bass (R)
 . Nelson I. Norton (R), from December 6, 1875

North Carolina 
 . Jesse J. Yeates (D)
 . John A. Hyman (R)
 . Alfred M. Waddell (D)
 . Joseph J. Davis (D)
 . Alfred M. Scales (D)
 . Thomas S. Ashe (D)
 . William M. Robbins (D)
 . Robert B. Vance (D)

Ohio 
 . Milton Sayler (D)
 . Henry B. Banning (D)
 . John S. Savage (D)
 . John A. McMahon (D)
 . Americus V. Rice (D)
 . Frank H. Hurd (D)
 . Lawrence T. Neal (D)
 . William Lawrence (R)
 . Earley F. Poppleton (D)
 . Charles Foster (R)
 . John L. Vance (D)
 . Ansel T. Walling (D)
 . Milton I. Southard (D)
 . Jacob P. Cowan (D)
 . Nelson H. Van Vorhes (R)
 . Lorenzo Danford (R)
 . Laurin D. Woodworth (R)
 . James Monroe (R)
 . James A. Garfield (R)
 . Henry B. Payne (D)

Oregon 
 . George A. La Dow (D), until May 1, 1875
 Lafayette Lane (D), from October 25, 1875

Pennsylvania 
 . Chapman Freeman (R)
 . Charles O'Neill (R)
 . Samuel J. Randall (D)
 . William D. Kelley (R)
 . John Robbins Jr. (D)
 . Washington Townsend (R)
 . Alan Wood Jr. (R)
 . Hiester Clymer (D)
 . A. Herr Smith (R)
 . William Mutchler (D)
 . Francis D. Collins (D)
 . Winthrop W. Ketcham (R), until July 19, 1876
 William H. Stanton (D), from November 7, 1876
 . James B. Reilly (D)
 . John B. Packer (R)
 . Joseph Powell (D)
 . Sobieski Ross (R)
 . John Reilly (D)
 . William Stenger (D)
 . Levi Maish (D)
 . Levi A. Mackey (D)
 . Jacob Turney (D)
 . James H. Hopkins (D)
 . Alexander G. Cochran (D)
 . John W. Wallace (R)
 . George A. Jenks (D)
 . James Sheakley (D)
 . Albert G. Egbert (D)

Rhode Island 
 . Benjamin T. Eames (R)
 . Latimer W. Ballou (R)

South Carolina 
 . Joseph Rainey (R)
 . Edmund W. M. Mackey (IR), until July 19, 1876
 Charles W. Buttz (R), from November 7, 1876
 . Solomon L. Hoge (R)
 . Alexander S. Wallace (R)
 . Robert Smalls (R)

Tennessee 
 . William McFarland (D)
 . Jacob M. Thornburgh (R)
 . George G. Dibrell (D)
 . Samuel M. Fite (D), until October 23, 1875
 Haywood Y. Riddle (D), from December 4, 1875
 . John M. Bright (D)
 . John F. House (D)
 . Washington C. Whitthorne (D)
 . John D. C. Atkins (D)
 . William P. Caldwell (D)
 . H. Casey Young (D)

Texas 
 . John H. Reagan (D)
 . David B. Culberson (D)
 . James W. Throckmorton (D)
 . Roger Q. Mills (D)
 . John Hancock (D)
 . Gustave Schleicher (D)

Vermont 
 . Charles H. Joyce (R)
 . Dudley C. Denison (IR)
 . George W. Hendee (R)

Virginia 
 . Beverly B. Douglas (D)
 . John Goode Jr. (D)
 . Gilbert C. Walker (D)
 . William H. H. Stowell (R)
 . George Cabell (D)
 . John R. Tucker (D)
 . John T. Harris (D)
 . Eppa Hutton, II (D)
 . William Terry (D)

West Virginia 
 . Benjamin Wilson (D)
 . Charles J. Faulkner (D)
 . Frank Hereford (D), until January 31, 1877

Wisconsin 
 . Charles G. Williams (R)
 . Lucien B. Caswell (R)
 . Henry S. Magoon (R)
 . William P. Lynde (D)
 . Samuel D. Burchard (D)
 . Alanson M. Kimball (R)
 . Jeremiah M. Rusk (R)
 . George W. Cate (D)

Non-voting members 
 . Hiram S. Stevens (D)
 . Thomas M. Patterson (D), until August 1, 1876
 . Jefferson P. Kidder (R)
 . Thomas W. Bennett (I), until June 23, 1876
 Stephen S. Fenn (D), from June 23, 1876
 . Martin Maginnis (D)
 . Stephen B. Elkins (R)
 . George Q. Cannon (R)
 . Orange Jacobs (R)
 . William R. Steele (D)

Changes in membership
The count below reflects changes from the beginning of the first session of this Congress.

Senate 
 Replacements: 4
 Democratic: 1 seat net gain
 Republican: 1 seat net loss
 Deaths: 3
 Resignations: 1
 Vacancy: 1
 Interim appointments: 3
 Seats of newly admitted states: 2
Total seats with changes: 7

|-
| Louisiana (3)
| Vacant
| Senate had declined to seat rival claimants William L. McMillen and P. B. S. Pinchback. Successor elected January 12, 1876.
| nowrap  | James B. Eustis (D)
| January 10, 1876

|-
| Tennessee (1)
| nowrap  | Andrew Johnson (D)
| Died July 31, 1875.Successor appointed August 18, 1875, to continue the term.
| nowrap  | David M. Key (D)
| August 18, 1875

|-
| Connecticut (3)
| nowrap  | Orris S. Ferry (R)
| Died November 21, 1875.Successor appointed November 27, 1875, to continue the term.
| nowrap  | James E. English (D)
| November 27, 1875

|-
| Connecticut (3)
| nowrap  | James E. English (D)
| Interim appointee retired May 17, 1876 when successor elected.Successor elected May 17, 1876.
| nowrap  | William H. Barnum (D)
| May 18, 1876

|-
| Maine (2)
| nowrap  | Lot M. Morrill (R)
| Resigned July 7, 1876 to become U.S. Secretary of the Treasury.Successor appointed July 10, 1876, to continue the term.Interim appointee later elected January 17, 1877.
| nowrap  | James G. Blaine (R)
| July 10, 1876

|-
| West Virginia (1)
| nowrap  | Allen T. Caperton (D)
| Died July 26, 1876.Successor appointed August 26, 1876, to continue the term.
| nowrap  | Samuel Price (D)
| August 26, 1876

|-
| Colorado (2)
| New seat
| Colorado admitted to the Union August 1, 1876.First senator elected November 15, 1876
| nowrap  | Henry M. Teller (R)
| November 15, 1876

|-
| Colorado (3)
| New seat
| Colorado admitted to the Union August 1, 1876.First senator elected November 15, 1876
| nowrap  | Jerome B. Chaffee (R)
| November 15, 1876

|-
| Tennessee (1)
| nowrap  | David M. Key (D)
| Interim appointee lost special election.Successor elected January 19, 1877.
| nowrap  | James E. Bailey (D)
| January 19, 1877

|-
| West Virginia (1)
| nowrap  | Samuel Price (D)
| Interim appointee lost special election.Successor elected January 26, 1877, but seat remained vacant until successor qualified by resigning from the U.S. House on January 31, 1877.
| nowrap  | Frank Hereford (D)
| January 31, 1877

|}

House of Representatives 

 Replacements: 14
 Democratic: no net change
 Republican: no net change
 Deaths: 9
 Resignations: 6
 Contested election: 5
 Seats of newly admitted states: 1
Total seats with changes: 21

|-
| 
| Vacant
| Rep-elect Garnett McMillan died before taking seat
| nowrap  | Benjamin H. Hill (D)
| May 5, 1875

|-
| 
| Vacant
| Rep. Samuel F. Hersey died during previous congress
| nowrap  | Harris M. Plaisted (R)
| September 13, 1875

|-
| 
| Vacant
| Rep.-elect Augustus F. Allen died before taking seat
| nowrap  | Nelson I. Norton (R)
| December 6, 1875

|-
| 
| nowrap  | James Buffington (R)
| Died March 7, 1875
| nowrap  | William W. Crapo (R)
| November 2, 1875

|-
| 
| nowrap  | George A. La Dow (D)
| Died May 1, 1875
| nowrap  | Lafayette Lane (D)
| October 25, 1875

|-
| 
| nowrap  | Samuel M. Fite (D)
| Died October 23, 1875
| nowrap  | Haywood Y. Riddle (D)
| December 14, 1875

|-
| 
| nowrap  | Henry H. Starkweather (R)
| Died January 28, 1876
| nowrap  | John T. Wait (R)
| April 12, 1876

|-
| 
| nowrap  | Josiah T. Walls (R)
| Lost contested election April 19, 1876
| nowrap  | Jesse J. Finley (D)
| April 19, 1876

|-
| 
| nowrap  | Charles B. Farwell (R)
| Lost contested election May 6, 1876
| nowrap  | John V. Le Moyne (D)
| May 6, 1876

|-
| 
| nowrap  | William H. Barnum (D)
| Resigned May 18, 1876, after being elected to the US Senate
| nowrap  | Levi Warner (D)
| December 4, 1876

|-
| 
| nowrap  | Frank Morey (R)
| Lost contested election June 8, 1876
| nowrap  | William B. Spencer (D)
| June 8, 1876

|-
| 
| nowrap  | Thomas W. Bennett (I)
| Lost contested election June 23, 1876
| nowrap  | Stephen S. Fenn (D)
| June 23, 1876

|-
| 
| nowrap  | James G. Blaine (R)
| Resigned July 10, 1876, after being appointed to the US Senate
| nowrap  | Edwin Flye (R)
| December 4, 1876

|-
| 
| nowrap  | Edward Y. Parsons (D)
| Died July 8, 1876
| nowrap  | Henry Watterson (D)
| August 12, 1876

|-
| 
| nowrap  | Winthrop W. Ketcham (R)
| Resigned July 19, 1876, after being appointed judge to the United States District Court for the Western District of Pennsylvania
| nowrap  | William H. Stanton (D)
| November 7, 1876

|-
| 
| nowrap  | Edmund W. M. Mackey (IR)
| style="font-size:80%" |Seat declared vacant July 19, 1876
| nowrap  | Charles W. Buttz (R)
| November 7, 1876

|-
| 
| nowrap  | Rufus S. Frost (R)
| Lost contested election July 28, 1876
| nowrap  | Josiah G. Abbott (D)
| July 28, 1876

|-
| 
| nowrap  | Thomas M. Patterson (D)
| Colorado admitted to the Union August 1, 1876
| colspan=2 | Statehood achieved

|-
| 
| New seat
| Colorado admitted to the Union August 1, 1876. Seat remained vacant until October 3, 1876.
| nowrap  | James B. Belford (R)
| October 3, 1876

|-
| 
| nowrap  | Michael C. Kerr (D)
| Died August 19, 1876
| nowrap  | Nathan T. Carr (D)
| December 15, 1876

|-
| 
| nowrap  | James D. Williams (D)
| Resigned December 1, 1876, after being elected Governor of Indiana
| nowrap  | Andrew Humphreys (D)
| December 5, 1876

|-
| 
| nowrap  | Smith Ely Jr. (D)
| Resigned December 11, 1876
| nowrap  | David D. Field II (D)
| January 11, 1877

|-
| 
| nowrap  | William B. Spencer (D)
| Resigned January 8, 1877, to become an associate justice of the Louisiana Supreme Court
| Vacant
| Not filled this term

|-
| 
| nowrap  | Frank Hereford (D)
| Resigned January 31, 1877, after being elected to the US Senate
| Vacant
| Not filled this term

|-
| 
| nowrap  | Benjamin H. Hill (D)
| Resigned March 3, 1877, after being elected to the US Senate
| Vacant
| Not filled this term

|}

Committees

Senate

 Agriculture (Chairman: Frederick T. Frelinghuysen; Ranking Member: Henry G. Davis)
 Appropriations (Chairman: William Windom; Ranking Member: Stephen W. Dorsey)
 Audit and Control the Contingent Expenses of the Senate (Chairman: John P. Jones; Ranking Member: George R. Dennis)
 Civil Service and Retrenchment (Chairman: Thomas F. Bayard; Ranking Member: John J. Patterson)
 Claims (Chairman: George G. Wright; Ranking Member: Samuel J.R. McMillan)
 Commerce (Chairman: Roscoe Conkling; Ranking Member: Samuel J.R. McMillan)
 Counting the Electoral Vote (Select)
 Distributing Public Revenue Among the States (Select)
 District of Columbia (Chairman: George E. Spencer; Ranking Member: Thomas J. Robertson)
 Education and Labor (Chairman: John J. Patterson; Ranking Member: William Sharon)
 Engrossed Bills (Chairman: Thomas F. Bayard; Ranking Member: Henry B. Anthony)
 Enrolled Bills
 Examine the Several Branches in the Civil Service (Select) (Chairman: James M. Harvey; Ranking Member: Augustus S. Merrimon)
 Finance (Chairman: John Sherman; Ranking Member: John P. Jones)
 Foreign Relations (Chairman: Simon Cameron; Ranking Member: Roscoe Conkling) 
 Indian Affairs (Chairman: William B. Allison; Ranking Member: Powell Clayton)
 Judiciary (Chairman: George F. Edmunds; Ranking Member: Timothy O. Howe) 
 Manufactures (Chairman: Thomas J. Robertson; Ranking Member: William A. Wallace)
 Military Affairs (Chairman: John A. Logan; Ranking Member: Ambrose E. Burnside)
 Mines and Mining (Chairman: Aaron A. Sargent; Ranking Member: William Sharon)
 Mississippi River Levee System (Select) (Chairman: James L. Alcorn; Ranking Member: Henry Cooper)
 Mississippi Election Frauds, 1876 (Chairman: George S. Boutwell; Ranking Member: Joseph E. McDonald)
 Naval Affairs (Chairman: Aaron H. Cragin; Ranking Member: Simon B. Conover)
 Ordnance and War Ships (Select)
 Patents (Chairman: Bainbridge Wadleigh; Ranking Member: John W. Johnston)
 Pensions (Chairman: John J. Ingalls; Ranking Member: Blanche Bruce)
 Post Office and Post Roads (Chairman: Hannibal Hamlin; Ranking Member: Algernon S. Paddock)
 Private Land Claims (Chairman: Allen G. Thurman; Ranking Member: George F. Edmunds)
 Privileges and Elections (Chairman: Oliver P. Morton; Ranking Member: Samuel J.R. McMillan)
 Public Buildings and Grounds (Chairman: Justin S. Morrill; Ranking Member: Newton Booth)
 Public Lands (Chairman: Richard J. Oglesby; Ranking Member: Newton Booth)
 Railroads (Chairman: Joseph R. West; Ranking Member: John H. Mitchell)
 Revision of the Laws (Chairman: George S. Boutwell; Ranking Member: Isaac P. Christiancy)
 Revolutionary Claims (Chairman: John W. Stevenson; Ranking Member: George G. Wright)
 Rules (Chairman: Thomas W. Ferry; Ranking Member: Augustus S. Merrimon)
 Tariff Regulation (Select)
 Territories (Chairman: Phineas W. Hitchcock; Ranking Member: William Sharon)
 Transportation Routes to the Seaboard (Select)
 Whole

House of Representatives

 Accounts (Chairman: Charles B. Roberts; Ranking Member: George G. Hoskins)
 Agriculture (Chairman: John H. Caldwell; Ranking Member: William B. Anderson)
 Appropriations (Chairman: William S. Holman; Ranking Member: Otho R. Singleton)
 Banking and Currency (Chairman: Samuel S. Cox; Ranking Member: Scott Wike) 
 Claims (Chairman: John M. Bright; Ranking Member: John F. Philips)
 Coinage, Weights and Measures (Chairman: Alexander H. Stephens; Ranking Member: Levi Maish)
 Commerce (Chairman: Elijah Ward; Ranking Member: Henry Myer Phillips)
 District of Columbia (Chairman: Aylett H. Buckner; Ranking Member: George Willard)
 Education and Labor (Chairman: Gilbert C. Walker; Ranking Member: William M. Springer) 
 Elections (Chairman: John T. Harris; Ranking Member: Earley F. Poppleton)
 Enrolled Bills
 Expenditures in the Interior Department (Chairman: William Mutchler; Ranking Member: Laurin D. Woodworth)
 Expenditures in the Justice Department (Chairman: Bernard G. Caulfield; Ranking Member: Edwin R. Meade)
 Expenditures in the Navy Department (Chairman: George M. Beebe; Ranking Member: John H. Burleigh)
 Expenditures in the Post Office Department (Chairman: William H. Stone; Ranking Member: William H.H. Stowell)
 Expenditures in the State Department (Chairman: William M. Springer; Ranking Member: John W. Wallace)
 Expenditures in the Treasury Department (Chairman: John M. Bright; Ranking Member: John S. Savage)
 Expenditures in the War Department (Chairman: John Robbins; Ranking Member: Lyman K. Bass)
 Expenditures on Public Buildings (Chairman: Henry B. Metcalfe; Ranking Member: Samuel N. Bell)
 Foreign Affairs (Chairman: Thomas Swann; Ranking Member: William H. Forney)
 Indian Affairs (Chairman: Alfred M. Scales; Ranking Member: Lafayette Lane)
 Invalid Pensions (Chairman: George A. Jenks; Ranking Member: Jesse J. Yeates)
 Judiciary (Chairman: J. Proctor Knott; Ranking Member: Bernard G. Caulfield) 
 Manufactures (Chairman: William H. Stone; Ranking Member: Samuel D. Burchard)
 Mileage (Chairman: Albert G. Egbert; Ranking Member: Nathaniel H. Odell)
 Military Affairs (Chairman: Henry B. Banning; Ranking Member: Augustus A. Hardenbergh)
 Militia (Chairman: Jacob P. Cowan; Ranking Member: John K. Tarbox)
 Mines and Mining (Chairman: Richard P. Bland; Ranking Member: Alexander Campbell)
 Mississippi Levees (Chairman: E. John Ellis; Ranking Member: James Sheakley)
 Naval Affairs (Chairman: Washington C. Whitthorne; Ranking Member: John Robbins)
 Pacific Railroads (Chairman: Lucius Quintus Cincinnatus Lamar II; Ranking Member: John F. Philips)
 Patents (Chairman: Robert B. Vance; Ranking Member: William E. Smith)
 Post Office and Post Roads (Chairman: John B. Clark Jr.; Ranking Member: William F. Slemons)
 Private Land Claims (Chairman: Thomas M. Gunter; Ranking Member: Lucien L. Ainsworth)
 Public Buildings and Grounds (Chairman: William S. Holman; Ranking Member: Casey Young)
 Public Expenditures (Chairman: Charles W. Milliken; Ranking Member: Alexander Campbell)
 Public Lands (Chairman: Milton Sayler; Ranking Member: Lafayette Lane)
 Railways and Canals (Chairman: Thomas L. Jones; Ranking Member: Levi A. Mackey)
 Reform in the Civil Service (Chairman: John O. Whitehouse; Ranking Member: Augustus W. Cutler)
 Revision of Laws (Chairman: Milton J. Durham; Ranking Member: Milton J. Durham)
 Revolutionary Pensions and War of 1812 (Chairman: Eppa Hunton; Ranking Member: John G. Schumaker)
 Rules (Select) (Chairman: Michael C. Kerr; Ranking Member: Samuel S. Cox)
 Standards of Official Conduct
 Territories (Chairman: Milton I. Southard; Ranking Member: Peter D. Wigginton)
 War Claims (Chairman: John R. Eden; Ranking Member: John H. Caldwell)
 Ways and Means (Chairman: William R. Morrison; Ranking Member: Chester W. Chapin)
 Whole

Joint committees

 Conditions of Indian Tribes (Special)
 Enrolled Bills (Chairman: Rep. Henry R. Harris; Vice Chairman: Rep. Harris M. Plaisted)
 Frame a Form of Government for the District of Columbia
 Investigate Chinese Immigration
 The Library (Chairman: Rep. Hiester Clymer; Vice Chairman: Rep. James Monroe)
 Printing (Chairman: Rep. John L. Vance; Vice Chairmam: Rep. Latimer W. Ballou)

Caucuses
 Democratic (House)
 Democratic (Senate)

Employees

Legislative branch agency directors 
Architect of the Capitol: Edward Clark
Librarian of Congress: Ainsworth Rand Spofford 
Public Printer of the United States: Almon M. Clapp, from 1876

Senate 
Chaplain: Byron Sunderland (Presbyterian)
Librarian: George F. Dawson
Secretary: George C. Gorham
Sergeant at Arms: John R. French

House of Representatives 
Chaplain: John George Butler (Lutheran), until December 6, 1875
 I. L. Townsend (Episcopalian), from December 6, 1875
Clerk: Edward McPherson, until December 6, 1875
 George M. Adams, elected December 6, 1875
Clerk at the Speaker’s Table: William H. Scudder
Doorkeeper: Lafayette H. Fitzhugh
Postmaster: James M. Steuart
Reading Clerks: Thomas S. Pettit (D) and Neill S. Brown Jr. (R)
Sergeant at Arms: Nehemiah G. Ordway, until December 6, 1875
 John G. Thompson, elected December 6, 1875

See also 
 1874 United States elections (elections leading to this Congress)
 1874–75 United States Senate elections
 1874–75 United States House of Representatives elections
 1876 United States elections (elections during this Congress, leading to the next Congress)
 1876 United States presidential election
 1876–77 United States Senate elections
 1876–77 United States House of Representatives elections

Notes

References

External links
Biographical Directory of the U.S. Congress
U.S. House of Representatives: House History
U.S. Senate: Statistics and Lists